The Temerty Faculty of Medicine (previously Faculty of Medicine) is the medical school of the University of Toronto. Founded in 1843, the faculty is based in Downtown Toronto and is one of Canada's oldest institutions of medical studies, being known for the discovery of insulin, stem cells and the site of the first single and double lung transplants in the world.

History

The university originally opened its medical school in 1843, providing instruction in medicine and medical sciences. In 1853, it suspended the school's teaching program and transferred teaching duties to the city's three proprietary schools: Trinity Medical College, the Toronto School of Medicine and Woman's Medical College. Because proprietary schools could not grant degrees, the university's medical school retained the responsibility of holding examinations and conferring medical degrees. As the university kept raising its standards, the medical examinations became increasingly rigorous and scientific. This led to fewer medical students from proprietary schools deciding to obtain university degrees, which were not required for medical practice at the time.

In 1887, the university resumed medical teaching in its Faculty of Medicine. The faculty promptly absorbed the Toronto School of Medicine, which could no longer compete with the university as it faced heavy costs of scientific work and higher examination standards set by the faculty.

The Faculty, in partnership with the University of Toronto Mississauga and Trillium Health Partners opened the Mississauga Academy of Medicine in August 2011 with 54 first-year students. As of 2014, the academy has a total of 216 students enrolled in the four-year program. The new facility is located across two floors inside the new Terrence Donnelly Health Sciences Complex and provides brand new classrooms, seminar rooms, computer facilities, learning spaces and laboratories. Students are provided with fully equipped student lounge and outdoor terrace to relax and socialize. Students are able to share lectures and learning experiences both inside and outside the classroom through advanced technologies.

In 2022, the Ontario government announced that University of Toronto Scarborough would provide medical training as well. The campus will receive 30 undergraduate seats and 45 postgraduate positions.

Curriculum

In 2016, the Faculty of Medicine implemented the new Foundations Curriculum, moving away from the traditional lecture based style of teaching based on anatomy, physiology, pathology and pharmacology and into a case-based learning approach with early clinical exposure.

The Doctor of Medicine program at the University of Toronto is a 4-year MD program with a total enrollment of about 850 students. The first two years are known as the preclerkship curriculum, during which M.D. candidates acquire the basic biomedical and human anatomy knowledge. The principles of medical ethics, professionalism and medical jurisprudence are also taught in preclerkship. The final two years form the clerkship curriculum that takes place in hospitals and ambulatory clinics. The core clerkship rotations cover the essential medical specialties: surgery and internal medicine, psychiatry, pediatrics, obstetrics and gynecology, family medicine, ambulatory experience, neurology, emergency medicine, anesthesia, ophthalmology, otolaryngology and dermatology. Additional rotations are devoted to elective clerkships that provide training in subdisciplines within the major specialities.

In 2018, the average accepted undergraduate weighted GPA was 3.96 (on the University of Toronto Weighted GPA (wGPA) Formula) and the median score in the numerically graded sections of the MCAT was 11. The University of Toronto is one of only a few programs in Canada to accept international students through its admission process. The faculty also offers the MD/PhD degree jointly with University of Toronto doctoral programs, in addition to other degrees of Master of Science, master of public health, master of health science, doctor of philosophy, and post-doctoral fellowships.

Departments, hospitals and research
The Faculty of Medicine is subdivided into 26 separate departments: Anesthesiology and Pain Medicine, Biochemistry, Biomedical Engineering, Institute of Donnelly Centre for Cellular and Biomolecular Research, Family and Community Medicine, Immunology, Laboratory Medicine and Pathobiology, Medical Biophysics, Medical Imaging, the Institute of Medical Science, Medicine, Molecular Genetics, Nutritional Sciences, Obstetrics and Gynaecology, Occupational Science and Occupational Therapy, Ophthalmology and Vision Sciences, Otolaryngology Head and Neck Surgery, Paediatrics, Pharmacology and Toxicology, Physical Therapy, Physiology, Psychiatry, Radiation Oncology, Rehabilitation Sciences Institute, Speech-Language Pathology and  Surgery.

The Faculty of Medicine is also the only medical school in the Greater Toronto Area and operates a health network that comprises twelve teaching hospitals with significant emphasis on tertiary care, including medical treatment, research and advisory services to patients and clients from Canada and abroad. The Faculty houses Biosafety level 3 facilities.

The faculty is associated with two level 1 adult trauma centres, a multi-organ transplant hospital, a pediatric hospital, a psychiatric hospital, a geriatric hospital, four rehabilitation institutes and several general hospitals.

The teaching hospitals are arranged in four hospital networks, which are the University Health Network, Unity Health Toronto, the Sinai Health System, the Trillium Health Partners, as well as three major teaching hospitals outside of the system, Sunnybrook Health Sciences Centre, Women's College Hospital and The Hospital for Sick Children.

The University Health Network consists of three specialized hospitals: Toronto General Hospital for cardiology and organ transplants; Princess Margaret Cancer Centre for oncology as the home of the Ontario Cancer Institute; and Toronto Western Hospital for neuroscience and musculoskeletal health.
Unity Health Toronto consists of St Michael's Hospital, an adult hospital and trauma center, Providence Healthcare, a rehabilitation institute and St. Joseph's Health Centre, a community teaching hospital.
Sinai Health System consists of Mount Sinai Hospital, a general hospital and Bridgepoint Active Healthcare, a rehabilitation institute.
Trillium Health Partners consists of Mississauga Hospital, a general hospital, Credit Valley Hospital, community teaching hospital,
Sunnybrook Health Sciences Centre is an adult hospital with regional cancer and trauma centres.
Women's College Hospital is an ambulatory hospital focused on women's health.
The Hospital for Sick Children is the pediatric medical centre specializing in treatments for childhood diseases and injuries.

Rotations may also involve community teaching hospitals, which include North York General Hospital, St. Joseph's Health Centre, Michael Garron Hospital, Scarborough General Hospital, Credit Valley Hospital and Markham Stouffville Hospital.

Collaborations with industry 
MaRS Discovery District is an affiliated corporation that was established to help commercialize the faculty's life science and medical research through partnerships with private enterprises.

On April 7, 2022, the University of Toronto announced a partnership with American biotechnology company Moderna intended to develop new tools to prevent and treat infectious diseases, collaborating with researchers in the fields of molecular genetics, biomedical engineering, and biochemistry. The collaboration is a joint venture across U of T's Faculties of Applied Science and Engineering and Medicine.

Reputation
In 2020 the school was ranked 4th in the world for clinical medicine and surgery by U.S. News & World Report. It was also ranked 5th in the world for pre-clinical, clinical and health by The Times Higher Education in its 2022 listings. It was ranked 13th in the world for medicine by the QS World Ranking. In 2020 the school was ranked 15th in the world Academic Ranking of World Universities for clinical medicine.

Notable alumni
Jennie Smillie Robertson, class of 1909: First female surgeon in Canada
Maud Menten, class of 1911: Developed the mathematics of enzyme kinetics with Leonor Michaelis
Theodore Drake, class of 1914: Pediatrician and inventor of the baby food Pablum
Norman Bethune, class of 1916: Physician, humanitarian and medical innovator
Frederick Banting, class of 1916 and Charles Best, class of 1925: Co-discoverers of insulin with professor of physiology John James Richard Macleod
Gladys Boyd, class of 1918: Pediatrician, pioneer in treatment of juvenile diabetes
Jessie Gray, class of 1934 and professor of clinical surgery: Canada's "First Lady of Surgery", lecturer, and researcher
Wilfred Gordon Bigelow, class of 1938: Developed the artificial pacemaker and the use of hypothermia in open heart surgery
Tom Pashby, class of 1940: Ophthalmologist and sport safety advocate, Order of Canada, Canada's Sport Hall of Fame
Robert Gordon Bell, class of 1943: Pioneered treatment of alcohol addiction in Canada and invented the alco-dial, a device to estimate blood alcohol levels.
Henry J. M. Barnett, class of 1944: Pioneered use of aspirin as a preventive therapy for heart attack and stroke
Robert B. Salter, class of 1947: Developed the continuous passive motion (CPM) treatment to aid recovery of joints after trauma
William Thornton Mustard, class of 1947: pediatric cardiac surgeon, developer of the Mustard procedure
Ernest McCulloch, class of 1948: Cellular biologist and Lasker Award recipient credited with the discovery of the stem cell
Raymond Stein, class of 1982: Ophthalmologist, medical director
Shaf Keshavjee, class of 1985: Transplant surgeon and ex-vivo lung transplant pioneer
C. Miller Fisher, described lacunar strokes and identified transient ischemic attacks as stroke precursors.
Daniel J. Drucker OC, FRS, class of 1980, professor of medicine and research endocrinologist

Notable past or present faculty
John E. Dick, professor of molecular genetics: Identified the cancer stem cell
Brenda Andrews, professor at the Donnelly Centre for Cellular and Biomolecular Research and researcher
Anthony Pawson, professor of molecular and medical genetics, 1985–2013: Researcher in signal transduction
Tirone E. David, professor of surgery, Developed valve-sparing aortic root replacement
Lap-Chee Tsui, professor of genetics, 1983–2002: Former vice-chancellor of the University of Hong Kong and president of Human Genome Organisation 
Stephen Scherer, University Professor in the Department of Molecular Genetics. Scherer's discoveries led to the initial description of genome-wide copy number variations (CNVs). He founded Canada's first human genome centre, the Centre for Applied Genomics (TCAG) at the Hospital for Sick Children. 
Tak Wah Mak, professor of medical biophysics, 1975–: Discovered the T-cell receptor
James Till, professor of medical biophysics, 1958–97: Academic on Internet research ethics
William Boyd, professor of pathology, 1937–1951, Author of important pathology textbooks
John C. Boileau Grant, professor of anatomy, 1930–56, Author of notable anatomy textbooks
Dafna D. Gladman, professor of medicine and Senior Scientist,  Krembil Research Institute, noted for research on psoriatic arthritis, systemic lupus erythematosus,  and rheumatoid arthritis
Lynn McDonald, professor in the Faculty of Social Work and Director of the Institute for Life Course and Aging
Padmaja Subbarao, respirologist, scientist in physiology and experimental medicine,  and Tier 1 Canada Research Chair in Pediatric Asthma and Lung Health

See also
 The Centre for Applied Genomics
 SciNet Consortium

References

Further reading
Michael Bliss. The Discovery of Insulin. University of Chicago Press, 1982.
Michael Bliss. Banting: A Biography. University of Toronto Press, 1992.
Marianne Fedunkiw. Rockefeller Foundation Funding and Medical Education in Toronto, Montreal, and Halifax. McGill-Queen's University Press, 2007.
Ernest McCulloch. The Ontario Cancer Institute: Successes and Reverses at Sherbourne Street. McGill-Queen's University Press, 2003.

External links
 University of Toronto Faculty of Medicine – Official website
 University of Toronto Medical Society – Medical Student Society (MedSoc)
Archival papers of Gordon A. Bates, student of the faculty and representative of the University of Toronto Medical Society (ca 1907), held at the University of Toronto Archives and Record Management Services
Archival papers of Bernhard Cinader, who established of the Department of Immunology at the Faculty of Medicine, are held at University of Toronto Archives and Record Management Services
Archival papers of James Arnold Dauphinee, Head of the Department of Pathological Chemistry in 1947, are held at University of Toronto Archives and Records Management Services
Archival papers of Donald Thomas Fraser, Professor at the Department of Hygiene and Preventive Medicine (1920-1954), and Frieda Helen Fraser, Professor at the Department of Hygiene and Preventive Medicine (1928-1965), are held at University of Toronto Archives and Records Management Services
Archival papers of Thomas P. Morley, Professor (1953-1985), are held at University of Toronto Archives and Records Management Services

Medicine, Faculty of
Toronto Faculty of Medicine, University of
University departments in Canada
BSL3 laboratories in Canada